Distant Satellites (stylised as distant satellites) is the tenth studio album by the British rock band Anathema. It was released in June 2014 via Kscope and reached #33 in the UK album charts.

Background and recording
The album was recorded at Cederberg Studios in Oslo, with producer Christer-André Cederberg, with some songs also mixed by Steven Wilson due to an operation on Cederberg's back.

The artwork was created by Korean new media artist Sang Jun Yoo, and based around his "Distant Light" installation.

The band released a statement on their new album prior to its release:

This is the first album to feature Daniel Cardoso as the band's primary drummer, replacing longtime member John Douglas. Douglas has since moved to electronic percussion and keyboards.

Critical reception

Distant Satellites received positive reviews from music critics. At Metacritic, which assigns a normalized rating out of 100 to reviews from mainstream critics, the album received an average score of 80 based on ten reviews, indicating "universal acclaim". The album ended the year at the 9th position of the 2014 Metal Hammer best albums list, as well at the 2nd position from Metal Hammer writer Adam Rees.

Despite a generally positive review, Sputnikmusic did lament the familiarity of it all stating, "Anathema stumbled onto musical gold when they crafted the formula used on We're Here Because We're Here. It's a formula they would be crazy to dismiss, and that's probably why they haven't... Overall, Anathema have struck gold for the third time in a row, but for the first time there are some prominent flaws as well."

Track listing

Singles
 The Lost Song – Part 3 Digital Single/EP
 "The Lost Song – Part 3" - 5:22
 "Coda" (Non-album track) - 1:12
 "The Lost Song – Part 3" (Ambient Mix) - 5:28

Personnel

 Vincent Cavanagh – lead vocals, electric guitars, acoustic guitars,
bass guitars, keyboards, programming, backing vocals
 John Douglas – electronic percussion, keyboards, programming
 Daniel Cavanagh – co-lead vocals, electric guitars, acoustic guitars,
bass guitars, keyboards, piano
 Lee Douglas – lead and backing vocals
 Jamie Cavanagh – bass guitar
 Daniel Cardoso – drums

Guest musicians
 Christer-André Cederberg – bass guitar

Production
 Christer-André Cederberg – production, mixing
 Sigbjørn Grimsæth – assistant engineer
 Sang Jun Yoo – photography
 Chris Sansom – mastering
 Dave Stewart – string arrangements
 Steven Wilson – mixing on "You're Not Alone" and "Take Shelter"

Charts

Release history

References

2014 albums
Anathema (band) albums
Kscope albums